Chris Richard may refer to:
Chris Richard (basketball) (born 1984), American basketball player
Chris Richard (baseball) (born 1974), former American Major League Baseball player

See also
Chris Richards (disambiguation)